Japan women's national goalball team is the women's national team of Japan.  Goalball is a team sport designed specifically for athletes with a vision impairment.  Its women's team has internationally completed including at the IBSA World Goalball Championships and the Paralympic Games.

Paralympic Games

2004 Athens 

At the 2004 Summer Paralympics in Athens, Greece, the team finished third.

2008 Beijing 

The team competed in 2008 Summer Paralympics, from 6 to 17 September 2008, in the Beijing Institute of Technology Gymnasium 'bat wing' arena, Beijing, China.  The team ranked seventh of eight in the round-robin stage, ahead of Germany.

Athletes were Akiko Adachi, Mieko Kato, Masae Komiya, Yuki Naoi, Tomoe Takada, and Rie Urata.

2012 London 

The team beat Sweden in the semi-finals which went into sudden death extra-throws, then took gold in the 2012 Summer Paralympics in London, England with a victory over China.  The Japanese women's goalball team included Masae Komiya, Rie Urata, and Akiko Adachi, led by coach Naoki Eguro.  Haruka Wakasugi was the youngest player.

Group C

Quarter-final

Semi-final

Final

2016 Rio 

Athletes for the 2016 Summer Paralympics in Rio de Janeiro, Brazil were Akiko Adachi, Eiko Kakehata, Masae Komiya, Yuki Tenma, Rie Urata, and Haruka Wakasugi, with escort Emi Kato, assistant coach Sayaka Sugiyama, and head coach Kyoichi Ichikawa.

Japan also lodged an unsuccessful protest with the International Blind Sports Federation regarding the late attendance of the Algeria team with a concern that they were disadvantaged compared to other teams.

Quarter-final

2020 Tokyo 

As the host nation, the team gets to compete in the 2020 Summer Paralympics, with competition from Wednesday 25 August to finals on Friday 3 September 2021, in the Makuhari Messe arena, Chiba, Tokyo, Japan.

Paralympian athletes (women's team): Norika Hagiwara (B3), Eiko Kakehata (B2), Rieko Takahashi (B1), Yuki Temma (B1), Rie Urata (B1), and Haruka Wakasugi (B1).

Round-robin

World Championships

2002 Rio de Janeiro 

The 2002 IBSA World Goalball Championships were held in Rio de Janeiro, Brazil.  The team was one of ten teams participating, and their first World Championships.  They finished ninth overall.

2014 Espoo 

They improved their ranking in the 2014 Championships in Espoo, Finland, but losing to Turkey to get fourth place.

2018 Malmö 

The team competed in the 2018 World Championships from 3 to 8 June 2018, in Malmö, Sweden.  They placed third in Pool C, losing to Canada in the quarter-finals, 2:3; and were fifth in the overall final standings.

2022 Matosinhos 

The team competed in the 2022 World Championships from 7 to 16 December 2022, at the Centro de Desportos e Congressos de Matosinhos, Portugal.  There were sixteen men's and sixteen women's teams.  They placed second in Pool B, and fifth in final standings.

IBSA World Games 

The 2003 IBSA World Games were held in Quebec City, Canada with 10 teams competing.  The first stage was pool play with 5 teams per pool and the top two teams in each pool advancing to the next round.  The team made it out of the round robin round.  Japan finished third after winning the bronze medal game.

The 2007 IBSA World Championships and Games were held in Brazil.  The women's goalball competition included thirteen teams, including this one.  The competition was a 2008 Summer Paralympics qualifying event. Masae Komia was sixth in the competition in scoring with 17 points.

Regional championships 

The team competed in  IBSA Asia goalball region, and from January 2010 became part of the IBSA Asia-Pacific goalball competition region.

2013 Beijing  

The team competed in the 2013 IBSA Asia Pacific Goalball Regional Championships, from 11 to 16 November 2013, in Beijing, China.  Of the four women's teams (Australia, China, Iran, Japan), Japan lost to China in the finals to take silver, 3:0, that went into overtime and then extra throws.

2015 Hangzhou  

The team competed in the 2015 IBSA Asia Pacific Goalball Regional Championships, from 8 to 12 November 2015, in the China National Goalball Training Centre, Hangzhou, China.  Of the four women's teams (Australia, China, Japan, Thailand), Japan took the gold medal from China, 1:0.

2017 Bangkok  

The team competed in the 2017 IBSA Asia/Pacific Goalball Regional Championships, from Monday 21 to Saturday 26 August 2017, in the Thai-Japan Sports Stadium, Din Daeng, Bangkok, Thailand.  They won the gold medal against China, 6:2.

2019 Chiba  

The team competed in the 2019 IBSA Goalball Asia-Pacific Regional Championships, from Thursday 5 to Tuesday 10 December 2019, in the Chiba Port Arena, Chiba, Japan. They placed first overall of six teams.

FESPIC Games 

In 2006, the team participated in the 9th edition of the FESPIC Games held in Kuala Lumpur.  They were one of three teams competing, the other two being Iran and China.

Competitive history 

The table below contains individual game results for the team in international matches and competitions.

Goal scoring by competition

See also 

 Disabled sports
 Japan men's national goalball team
 Japan at the Paralympics

References

Goalball
National women's goalball teams
Japan at the Paralympics
Goalball in Japan
Goalball in Asia